The year 1959 in archaeology involved some significant events.

Explorations

Excavations
 At Mesa Verde National Park, the Wetherill Mesa Archeological Project begins for excavation of three cliff dwellings (Long House, Mug House, and Step House), including a survey of Wetherill Mesa and excavation of selected mesa-top sites (completed in 1972).
 Excavations begin at Amri (completed in 1962).
 Excavations at Nonsuch Palace, Surrey, England, by Martin Biddle begin (completed in 1960).
 Excavations at Caernarfon Mithraeum by National Museum Wales.
 Rescue excavation of Roman villa at Cox Green, Berkshire, England.
 Excavations at Finglesham Anglo-Saxon cemetery begin under the direction of Sonia Chadwick Hawkes (completed in 1967).

Publications
 Alan H. Gardiner - The Royal Canon of Turin.

Finds
 July 17 - Mary Leakey and Louis Leakey find Paranthropus (originally designated "Zinjanthropus") in Olduvai Gorge.
 Arlington Springs Man is found by Phil C. Orr on Santa Rosa Island, California.
 Ongoing excavations at Peking Man Site in Zhoukoudian, China unearth a mandible fragment.
 Da He ding discovered at Tanheli in Hunan, China.

Awards

Miscellaneous
 International Centre for the Study of the Preservation and Restoration of Cultural Property opens in Rome.

Births

Deaths
 December 6 - John Winter Crowfoot, English archaeologist and educational administrator (b. 1873)

References

Archaeology
Archaeology
Archaeology by year